Sławomir Zwierzyński (born 20 November 1966) is a Polish fencer. He competed in the team épée events at the 1992 Summer Olympics.

References

External links
 

1966 births
Living people
Polish male fencers
Olympic fencers of Poland
Fencers at the 1992 Summer Olympics
Fencers from Warsaw